In finance, an admissible trading strategy or admissible strategy is any trading strategy with wealth almost surely bounded from below.  In particular, an admissible trading strategy precludes unhedged short sales of any unbounded assets.  A typical example of a trading strategy which is not admissible is the doubling strategy.

Mathematical definition 
In a market with  assets, a trading strategy  is admissible if  is almost surely bounded from below.  In the definition let  be the vector of prices,  be the risk-free rate (and therefore  is the discounted price).

In a model with more than one time then the wealth process associated with an admissible trading strategy must be uniformly bounded from below.

References 

Mathematical finance